Esta historia me suena is a Mexican anthology television series produced by Genoveva Martínez for Televisa.

Series overview

Episodes

Season 1: Vol. 1 (2019)

Season 2: Vol. 2 (2019–20)

Season 3: Vol. 3 (2020)

Season 4: Vol. 4 (2021)

Season 5: Vol. 5 (2022)

Notes

References

External links 
 
 

Esta historia me suena